Cakewalk is an album by the American alternative rock duo House of Freaks, released in 1991. It was the duo's first album for a major label.

"Rocking Chair" peaked at No. 11 on Billboard'''s Modern Rock Tracks chart. The album was a commercial disappointment.

Production
The album was produced by Dennis Herring. The duo brought in Bob Rupe, of the Silos, to play bass; Mark Linkous also contributed to the recording. Johnny Hott sang his first lead vocal on "My House".

The former Long Ryders guitar player Stephen McCarthy joined the band for the tour in support of the album.

Critical receptionThe Indianapolis Star wrote that "Bryan Harvey's guitar glides while Johnny Hott seems to have just found his drums in the garage, infusing hyperactive beats and even pounding on garbage can lids." Trouser Press determined that "the diverse, often busy (but occasionally spare, as in the offhand acoustics of 'Magpie Wing') arrangements could have dandified even plain material, but the pair’s writing, notwithstanding a lyrical shift to more personal reflections, is right on track." Entertainment Weekly called Cakewalk a "strikingly nuanced, pristinely produced" album.The Washington Post thought that "the lyrics still have a Southern gothic quality, but they've lost their literary density and better resemble the country and blues sources Harvey draws on." The Milwaukee Sentinel deemed the album "lively and occasionally even rowdy, but it's also a mature piece of work that draws gently on the roots of everyday life in a Southern town." The Chicago Tribune concluded that "an off-handed charm pervades Cakewalk, which has a similar feel to Paul McCartney's first solo album but skirts overbearing preciousness."

AllMusic wrote that "the charming, Jules Shear-like 'Honor Among Lovers' and the Waitsian drinking song 'Remember Me Well' stand out." The Calgary Herald included Calkewalk on its list of the 20 best albums of 1991; The Morning Call considered it one of the year's 16 best, while the Milwaukee Sentinel'' considered it one of the 10 best.

Track listing

References

House of Freaks albums
1991 albums
Giant Records (Warner) albums